In non-equilibrium physics,  the Keldysh formalism is a general framework for describing the quantum mechanical evolution of a system in a non-equilibrium state or systems subject to time varying external fields (electrical field, magnetic field etc.). Historically, it was foreshadowed by the work of Julian Schwinger and proposed almost simultaneously by Leonid Keldysh and, separately, Leo Kadanoff and Gordon Baym. It was further developed by later contributors such as O. V. Konstantinov and V. I. Perel.

Extensions to driven-dissipative open quantum systems is given not only for bosonic systems, but also for fermionic systems.

The Keldysh formalism provides a systematic way to study non-equilibrium systems, usually based on the two-point functions corresponding to excitations in the system. The main mathematical object in the Keldysh formalism is the non-equilibrium Green's function (NEGF), which is a two-point function of particle fields. In this way, it resembles the Matsubara formalism, which is based on equilibrium Green functions in imaginary-time and treats only equilibrium systems.

Time evolution of a quantum system  

Consider a general quantum mechanical system. This system has the Hamiltonian . Let the initial state of the system be the pure state . In this section, we will see how time evolution actually works in quantum mechanics.

Consider a Hermitian operator . In the Heisenberg picture of quantum mechanics, this operator is time-dependent and the state is not. The expectation value of the operator  is given by

where, due to time evolution of operators in the Heisenberg picture, .

For perturbative quantum mechanics and quantum field theory, it is often more convenient to use the interaction picture. The interaction picture operator is

where . Then, defining  we have

Since the time-evolution unitary operators satisfy , the above expression can be rewritten as

,

Path ordering on the Keldysh contour 

Then we can introduce notation of path ordering on this contour, by defining  , where  is a permutation such that , and the plus and minus signs are for bosonic and fermionic operators respectively. Note that this is a generalization of time ordering.

With this notation, the above time evolution is written as

Where  corresponds to the time  on the forward branch of the Keldysh contour, and the integral over  goes over the entire Keldysh contour.

Keldysh diagrammatic technique for Green's functions 

Or, in the interaction picture,  . We can expand the exponential as a Taylor series to obtain the perturbation series

.

This is the same procedure as in equilibrium diagrammatic perturbation theory, but with the important difference that both forward and reverse contour branches are included.

If, as is often the case,  is a polynomial or series as a function of the elementary fields , we can organize this perturbation series into monomial terms and apply all possible Wick pairings to the fields in each monomial, obtaining a summation of Feynman diagrams. However, the edges of the Feynman diagram correspond to different propagators depending on whether the paired operators come from the forward or reverse branches. Namely,

Note that  is the propagator used in ordinary ground state theory.

Then each (unrenormalized) edge directed from a vertex  (with position , time  and sign ) to a vertex  (with position , time  and sign ) corresponds to the propagator . Then the diagram values for each choice of  signs (there are  such choices, where  is the number of internal vertices) are all added up to find the total value of the diagram.

See also 
Spin Hall effect
Kondo effect

References

Other 

Gianluca Stefanucci and Robert van Leeuwen (2013). "Nonequilibrium Many-Body Theory of Quantum Systems: A Modern Introduction" (Cambridge University Press, 2013). DOI:  https://doi.org/10.1017/CBO9781139023979
Robert van Leeuwen, Nils Erik Dahlen, Gianluca Stefanucci, Carl-Olof Almbladh and Ulf von Barth,  "Introduction to the Keldysh Formalism", Lectures Notes in Physics 706, 33 (2006). arXiv:cond-mat/0506130

Condensed matter physics
Electromagnetism